Invasion, U.S.A. (sometime stylized Invasion USA) is a 1952 American drama film based on a story by Robert Smith and Franz Spencer and directed by Alfred E. Green. The film stars Gerald Mohr, Peggie Castle and Dan O'Herlihy. Invasion, U.S.A. is set in the Cold War and portrays the invasion of the United States by an unnamed communist enemy which likely refers to the Soviet Union. It is typical of the Red Scare film genre, common throughout the 1950s.

Plot
In a New York City bar, the brooding, mysterious forecaster Mr. Ohman (Dan O'Herlihy) is sitting and drinking from a very large brandy glass. He gets into discussions with a cross-section of affluent Americans at the bar, including local television newscaster Vince Potter (Gerald Mohr), beautiful young New York society woman Carla Sanford (Peggie Castle), a California industrialist, a rancher from Arizona, and a congressman. International news is bad, but the Americans do not want to hear it. While they all dislike communism and appreciate the material wealth they enjoy, they also want lower taxes and fail to see the need for industrial support of government. As he swishes the brandy around his snifter, Ohman tells the others that many Americans want safety and security but do not want to make any sacrifices for it.

Suddenly the news becomes worse. "The Enemy" is staging air attacks over Seal Point, Alaska and then Nome. Paratroops have landed on Alaskan airfields. Soon, the enemy's plan of attack becomes clear: civilian airfields are captured as staging areas while military airfields are A-bombed. The US fights back and attacks the enemy's homeland with Convair B-36 missions, but the enemy steadily moves into Washington State and Oregon. Shipyards in Puget Sound have been nuclear striked with large casualties.

Meanwhile, the Americans at the bar scramble to return to their lives to do what they can against the enemy now that it is too late. Potter and Sanford fall for each other ("War or no war, people have to eat and drink... and make love!"). He continues to broadcast while she volunteers to help run a blood drive. The industrialist and the rancher both return home to find themselves on the front lines. The former is caught in the battle for San Francisco, the latter in the destruction of Boulder Dam by a nuclear missile. The US president, whose face is never shown in front view, only in rear view, makes ineffectual broadcasts with inflated claims of counterattacks to rally the morale of the people. The enemy continues to advance with stealth attacks by troops dressed in American uniforms (a plot point made necessary due to the film’s reliance on stock footage of US paratroopers to depict the invasion), including a paratrooper attack on the US Capitol that kills the congressman. New York is A-bombed, and Potter is soon killed during a broadcast. Sanford, threatened with rape by an enemy soldier, narrowly escapes his assault as she jumps from the balcony, presumably to her death.

Suddenly, the image of her falling body appears in Ohman's brandy snifter. All five suddenly find themselves back in the bar since they have just emerged from a hypnotic state that Ohman had induced. After reassuring themselves that the recent events, including their deaths, did not really happen, they hurry off to take measures to boost military preparedness. Potter and Sanford "resume" their romance.

Cast

 Gerald Mohr as Vince Potter
 Peggie Castle as Carla Sanford
 Dan O'Herlihy as Mr. Ohman
 Robert Bice as George Sylvester
 Tom Kennedy as Tim the Bartender
 Wade Crosby as Illinois Congressman Arthur V. Harroway
 Erik Blythe as Ed Mulfory
 Phyllis Coates as Mrs. Mulfory
 Aram Katcher as Factory Window Washer
 Knox Manning as himself
 Edward G. Robinson Jr. as Radio Dispatcher
 Noel Neill as Second Airline Ticket Agent
 Clarence A. Shoop as Army Major
 Joseph Granby as President of the United States (uncredited)

Production
Invasion, U.S.A. was the second film from American Pictures Corporation, who had just made their first film, Captive Women. The company consisted of Albert Zugsmith, Peter Miller, Aubrey Wisberg and Jack Pollexfen with Joseph Justman as producer. They planned to make six films a year for five years out of a fund of $3.5 million. Robert Smith wrote the script. The film had the co-operation of the US Civil Defense.

Harold Daniels was to direct but he was instead assigned to American Pictures Corporation's, Port Sinister, and Alfred E. Green replaced him. Ron Randell was meant to appear in the cast but had to pull out. William Schallert replaced Clete Roberts. Gerald Mohr replaced Michael O'Shea. Filming started 26 March 1952.

Zugsmith said the film was made for a cash budget of $127,000 with $60,000 deferred. He called the movie the way that he really learned filmmaking, and he got an education from Al Green and Ralph Black in particular.

"The Enemy" is never named but is clearly meant to be taken as the communist Soviet Union because of its approach through Alaska, pseudo-Slavic accents, and "People's Army" proclamations. Principal photography began in early April 1952 at Motion Picture Center Studios.

Much of the film's running time is taken up with inconsistent combat stock footage.

On a philosophical level, Invasion, U.S.A. is also often viewed as humorously (and unintentionally) ironic, as the lesson it communicates encourages citizens to subordinate their individual needs and desires to that of the state to combat communism.

Phyllis Coates and Noel Neill, two Lois Lane actresses, and William Schallert, a B-movie stalwart, all have small parts in the film.

Reception
A contemporary review in Variety states: "This production imaginatively poses the situation of a foreign power invading the US with atom bombs. Startling aspects of the screenplay [from a story by Robert Smith and Franz Spencer] are further parlayed through effective use of war footage secured from the various armed services and the Atomic Energy Commission."

The film was commercially successful and brought in net profits of about $1.2 million, according to Zugmsith.

Later issues
Invasion, U.S.A. was subsequently shown on television in the late 1960s but then was not widely viewed for a long time. In 1994, it was spoofed as Episode 602 on the movie-mocking television show Mystery Science Theater 3000.

In 1998, Invasion, U.S.A. was released on VHS, then on DVD in 2002. A special edition in 2009 featured two original Civil Defense Department audio recordings on the alternate DVD audio track: The Complacent Americans and If the Bomb Falls: A Recorded Guide to Survival. The 1956 reissue theatrical trailer; and interviews with stars, Dan O'Herlihy, William Schallert and Noel Neill. The original and controversial "Red Scare" short Red Nightmare, narrated by Jack Webb, was also included in the bonus features.

See also
Face to Face with Communism
Rocket Attack U.S.A.
Invasion literature

References

Bibliography

 Beaulieu, Trace. The Mystery Science Theater 3000 Amazing Colossal Episode Guide. New York: Bantam, 1996. .

External links

Production history of film at Conelrad.com

Invasion U.S.A. on MUBI
MST3K treatment on ShoutFactoryTV

1952 films
1952 drama films
American drama films
American anti-communist propaganda films
American aviation films
American black-and-white films
Cold War films
Columbia Pictures films
Films about nuclear war and weapons
Films directed by Alfred E. Green
Collage film
Films about hypnosis
Films scored by Albert Glasser
Films with screenplays by Franz Schulz
Films about World War III
1950s English-language films
1950s American films